Caloncoba is a genus of flowering plants belonging to the family Achariaceae.

Its native range is Tropical Africa.

Species:

Caloncoba brevipes 
Caloncoba crepiniana 
Caloncoba echinata 
Caloncoba flagelliflora 
Caloncoba gilgiana 
Caloncoba glauca 
Caloncoba lophocarpa 
Caloncoba subtomentosa 
Caloncoba suffruticosa 
Caloncoba welwitschii

References

Achariaceae
Malpighiales genera